Giorgi Samsonovich Dzotsenidze (born 10 February 1910 – 5 May 1976) was a Georgian geologist and statesman. As a politician he held the posts of Chairman of the Presidium of the Supreme Soviet of the Georgian Soviet Socialist Republic (1959–1976) and the deputy chairman of the Presidium of the Supreme Soviet (1960–1976). As a scientist, he was Academician of the Academy of Sciences of the USSR and vice-president of the Georgian Academy of Sciences.

Dzotsenidze was born in a peasant family in Kutaisi and graduated from the Tbilisi State University in 1929. In 1933–1934 he briefly headed the department of mineralogy and petrography at the pedagogical institute in Kutaisi, and from 1934 to 1959 held positions of professor, dean and rector (1958–59) of the Tbilisi University. Between 1951 and 1955 he was a secretary, and from 1955 to 1958 the first vice-president of the Georgian Academy of Sciences. His scientific works concerned paleovolcanology and the connection between magmatism and tectonics. In particular, he was one of the founders of the theory of volcanogenic-sedimentary lithogenesis.

In 1940 he became member of the Communist Party. In 1959 he was chosen as Chairman of the Presidium of the Supreme Soviet of the Georgian SSR, and in 1960 appointed as the deputy chairman of the Presidium of the Supreme Soviet. He held these posts until his death in 1976. During his career he received the State Prize of the USSR (1950), and awarded two Orders of Lenin and the Order of the Red Banner of Labour.

References

 

1910 births
1976 deaths
20th-century politicians from Georgia (country)
People from Kutaisi
Politicians from Kutaisi
Communist Party of Georgia (Soviet Union) politicians
Full Members of the USSR Academy of Sciences
Members of the Georgian National Academy of Sciences
Rectors of Tbilisi State University
Tbilisi State University alumni
Stalin Prize winners
Lenin Prize winners
Recipients of the Order of Lenin
Recipients of the Order of the Red Banner of Labour
Geologists from Georgia (country)
Soviet geologists
Burials in Georgia (country)
Communist Party of the Soviet Union members